The Shire of Coolgardie is a local government area in the Goldfields–Esperance region of Western Australia, lying roughly west and south of the city of Kalgoorlie.

History
The Shire of Coolgardie originated as the Coolgardie Road District, which was established on 7 August 1896, consisting of the rural areas surrounding the town of Coolgardie, which had already been incorporated as the Municipality of Coolgardie in 1894. As the gold rush waned in the area, the municipality merged into the road district on 20 May 1921.

It was declared a shire with effect from 1 July 1961 following the passage of the Local Government Act 1960, which reformed all remaining road districts into shires.

Wards

In 2007, the ward system was abolished. Prior to this, the Shire had eight councillors and four wards:

 Kambalda West (three councillors)
 Kambalda (two councillors)
 Coolgardie (two councillors)
 Country (one councillor)

Towns and localities
The towns and localities of the Shire of Coolgardie with population and size figures based on the most recent Australian census:

Ghost towns
Ghost towns in the Shire of Coolgardie:
 Bonnie Vale
 Burbanks (also Burbanks Gold Mine)
 Dunnsville
 Kintore
 Kunanalling
 Kundana
 Kurrawang
 Mungari
 Spargoville

Heritage-listed places

As of 2023, 161 places are heritage-listed in the Shire of Coolgardie, of which 27 are on the State Register of Heritage Places.

References

External links
 

 
Coolgardie